Andres "Dres" Vargas-Titus (born March 18, 1967) is an American hip hop artist. He is known for being the lead rapper of the alternative hip hop duo Black Sheep, before recording as a solo artist.

Career
Dres formed Black Sheep in 1989 with Mista Lawnge. Their first appearance together was on De La Soul's 1991 album De La Soul Is Dead. Dres was featured on the track "Fanatic of the B Word". Their first album, A Wolf in Sheep's Clothing, was released in 1991 and featured the singles "Flavor of the Month", "The Choice Is Yours", "Strobelite Honey", and "Similak Child". Due to the lackluster sales of their second album, Non-Fiction, Dres and Mista Lawnge split up and started independent projects.

In 1999, credited as Dres the Black Sheep, Dres released a solo album titled Sure Shot Redemption. In 2000, Black Sheep reunited and recorded the EP, Redlight, Greenlight, and the title track of the film Once in the Life. In 2006, Dres released another solo album titled 8WM/Novakane. In 2009, Dres released an EP titled From the Black Pool of Genius: the Prelude, in preparation for his solo LP From the Black Pool of Genius, which was released June 2010.

Personal life
Dres was raised in the Astoria Houses in the Astoria section of Queens, NY, and the Bland Houses (commonly known as "The Bland") in the Flushing section of Queens, NY. His family later moved to North Carolina.

Dres is the father of Honor Titus, the singer of the punk-rock band Cerebral Ballzy.

Dres is not blood related to Chi Ali.

Dres is of African American and Puerto Rican descent.

Solo discography

Albums

Featured tracks
"Fanatic Of The B Word" by De La Soul, from its 1991 album De La Soul Is Dead.
"Work To Do" by Vanessa L. Williams, from her 1991 album The Comfort Zone.
"Let The Horns Blow" by Chi Ali, from his 1992 album The Fabulous Chi-Ali.
"Roll Wit Tha Flava" by the Flavor Unit MCs, from the 1993 album Roll Wit Tha Flava.
"En Focus" by De La Soul, from its 1993 album Buhloone Mindstate.
"First...and Then" by Handsome Boy Modeling School from its 2004 album White People.
"Foolin' Around" by Rhymefest from his 2008 mixtape Man in the Mirror.
 "React with a mic" by Twista from his 1994 album Resurrection
"Back on the Scene" By Slaughterhouse from its 2011 Slaughterhouse EP

Filmography
Who's the Man? (1993) as Malik
Once in the Life  (2000) as Hector
"Words Up!" a CBS Schoolbreak Special, Season 10, Episode 2 (1992) as Aeschylus

See also
Native Tongues
Black Sheep (hip hop group)

References

External links

Video interview
Black Sheep official website
Black Sheep (group)

African-American male actors
American male actors
African-American male rappers
American people of Puerto Rican descent
Hispanic and Latino American rappers
Five percenters
Living people
Tommy Boy Records artists
Rappers from New York City
1967 births
21st-century American rappers
21st-century American male musicians
21st-century African-American musicians
20th-century African-American people